Spargania bellipicta is a species of geometrid moth in the family Geometridae. It is found in North America.

The MONA or Hodges number for Spargania bellipicta is 7311.

References

Further reading

 
 

Hydriomenini
Articles created by Qbugbot
Moths described in 1901